RPM was a Canadian magazine that published the best-performing singles of Canada from 1964 to 2000. Eighteen songs reached number one in 1995. Bon Jovi had the first number-one hit of the year with "Always", and Alanis Morissette finished the year at number one with "Hand in My Pocket". Eight musical artists topped the RPM Singles Chart for the first time this year: Jann Arden, R.E.M., Dionne Farris, the Rembrandts, Hootie & the Blowfish, Gin Blossoms, Take That, and Alanis Morissette. No musical act topped the chart with more than one single in 1995.

Gin Blossoms spent the most weeks at number one, six, with "Til I Hear It from You". However, it was the Rembrandts' song "I'll Be There for You"—best known as the opening theme for the American sitcom Friends—that topped the RPM year-chart for 1995; it spent five weeks at the number-one position in July and August. In September, Tom Cochrane accomplished a rare feat by debuting at number one with "I Wish You Well", an event that had only been seen once before, in 1985 with Band Aid's "Do They Know It's Christmas?" (this does not include the magazine's number-one single from its debut issue).

Jann Arden, Bryan Adams, Tom Cochrane, and Alanis Morissette were the four Canadians who topped their native country's chart in 1995. Adams peaked at number one for five weeks with "Have You Ever Really Loved a Woman?", and Elton John picked up his 18th Canadian chart-topper with "Believe", which had a four-week stint at the summit. Morissette's "Hand in My Pocket" also stayed at number one for four weeks, and Arden—along with Boyz II Men, Sheryl Crow, and Hootie & the Blowfish—topped the chart for three weeks.

Chart history

Notes

See also
1995 in music
List of number-one albums of 1995 (Canada)

References

External links
 Read about RPM Magazine at the AV Trust
 Search RPM charts here at Library and Archives Canada

 
1995 record charts
1995